Nelly Guilbert (born 12 September 1979, in Carpentras) is a retired French footballer who spent the majority of her career at Juvisy of the Division 1 Féminine. She played as a defender winning three titles (league twice and cup once) and was also a French international having attained nine caps from 1998 to 2005.

Club career
Early career
Born in Carpentras (a commune in the Vaucluse department), she began playing for nearby Football Club Féminin Monteux Vaucluse in the juniors and lower divisions from 1992 until making to the first team in 1997 and leaving the club in the following year.

Juvisy
Guilbert moved to FCF Juvisy ahead of the National 1A 1998–99 season. After the creation of the UEFA Women's Cup for clubs in 2001–02, France re-branded the National 1A to Division 1 Féminine (D1). Guilbert helped Juvisy win D1 inaugural season in 2002–03. In the next season she played three matches of the 2003–04 UEFA Women's Cup, scoring against Polish side AZS Wrocław.

Juvisy finished as D1 runners up in 2004–05 and won the French Cup, beating Olympique Lyonnais in the final. After a 1–1 draw, the match was decided on penalty shoot-out, with Guilbert converting Juvisy's sixth shot, on their 5–4 win.

She won the D1 for a second time in 2005–06 and played two matches in the 2006–07 UEFA Women's Cup. She reached the quarter-finals of the 2010–11 UEFA Women's Champions League and the semi-finals of the 2012–13 UEFA Women's Champions League.

After eighteen seasons playing for Juvisy, including over 300 matches played in all competitions, Guilbert and Amélie Coquet retired from football at the end of the 2015–16 season.

She is one of the longest-serving players at the club alongside Sandrine Soubeyrand.

International career
Youth
On 4 October 1997, while still a FCF Monteux Vaucluse player, she was called up to international level for the first time by coach Bruno Bini to play with the under-18 team against Switzerland and became part of the 1998 UEFA Women's Under-18 Championship French runners up team. She played four matches in this tournament and six matches overall.

Despite having already played at senior level, on 10 April 2001, under coach Gérard Prêcheur she played one match for the under-21 team against Sweden.

Senior
Guilbert made her senior international debut on 15 February 1998 in a friendly match against England. She earned a total of nine caps from 1998 to 2005, all in friendly matches.

Career statistics

Club
Statistics accurate as of 21 September 2016.

International

(Correct as of 21 September 2016)

Honours

Club
Juvisy
Division 1 Féminine (2): 2002–03, 2005–06
Coupe de France Féminine (1): 2005

References

External links

 
 
 
 FFF profile 
 Player stats at footofeminin.fr 

1979 births
Living people
French women's footballers
France women's international footballers
People from Carpentras
Paris FC (women) players
Women's association football defenders
Sportspeople from Vaucluse
Footballers from Provence-Alpes-Côte d'Azur